"" (Children's Hymn) is a poem by Bertolt Brecht, written in 1950 and set to music by Hanns Eisler in the same year.

History
The hymn was Brecht's response to the "", which he believed to be corrupted by the Third Reich and whose third stanza became the national anthem of West Germany in 1950. There are several allusions to the "": "From the Meuse to the Memel, / From the Adige to the Belt" vs. Brecht's "From the ocean to the Alps, / From the Oder to the Rhine", or "Germany, Germany above all" vs. "we desire to be not above, and not below other peoples". East Germany already had an anthem by the time Brecht wrote the poem and West Germany was in the process of re-adapting the third stanza of the Deutschlandlied as the national anthem by then – Brecht's writing of the text was a reaction in part to West German Chancellor Konrad Adenauer having the song played at official functions in 1950.

The verse form and the rhyme scheme are similar to both the "" and "", the national anthem of East Germany. Accordingly, the three lyrics can be combined with the melodies.

In order to create a new all-German national anthem during the German reunification, several public campaigns supported the use of the "". However, those suggestions were overruled; the hymn remained the same. While the Basic Law of Germany establishes a coat of arms and flag, the constitution is silent on the national anthem. The anthem was decided upon and reconfirmed not by the usual legislative process but by an exchange of open letters between chancellor and president (Konrad Adenauer and Theodor Heuss in the early years of West Germany, and Helmut Kohl writing to Richard von Weizsäcker following reunification). It is therefore unclear which act – if any – could make the children's hymn Germany's national anthem.

Text
Note that the English translation is poetic, not literal.

See also
 1950 in poetry

References

External links
 Text 
 
 

Songs with lyrics by Bertolt Brecht
Compositions by Hanns Eisler
German poems
1950 poems
1950 songs
German patriotic songs